Civifractura is a monotypic genus of deep sea amphipods in the family, Alicellidae, first described in 2020 by Johanna Weston, Rachael Peart, and Alan Jamieson, which consists of the species Civifractura serendipia. The species epithet, serendipia, refers to its serendipitous discovery. This species was found at a depth of 4932 m in the Wallaby-Zenith fracture zone of the Indian Ocean.

References

External links
Image of Civifractura serendipia

Gammaridea
Monotypic crustacean genera
Crustaceans described in 2020